Gang War is a 1958 American crime film directed by Gene Fowler, Jr. and written by Louis Vittes. The film stars Charles Bronson, Kent Taylor, Jennifer Holden, John Doucette, Gloria Henry and Gloria Grey. The film was released in July 1958, by 20th Century Fox.

It was the second of two films Gene Fowler directed with Charles Bronson for Regal Films, the other being Showdown at Boot Hill.

Writer Vittes and director Fowler later made The Oregon Trail for Regal.

Plot
A Los Angeles high-school teacher's problems begin when he happens to witness a gangland killing and agrees to identify the murderers. Not realizing this will cause the underworld to retaliate "big time".

Cast

Production

Filming
Filming started 11 December 1957.

References

External links 
 

Gang War at BFI

1958 films
20th Century Fox films
American drama films
1958 drama films
Films directed by Gene Fowler Jr.
Films scored by Paul Dunlap
1950s English-language films
1950s American films